This is the discography of British post-punk band Red Lorry Yellow Lorry.

Albums

Studio albums

Compilation albums

Video albums

EPs

Singles

References

Discographies of British artists
Rock music group discographies